is a railway station in Nishi-ku, Nagoya, Aichi Prefecture, Japan.

The station is built over Route 302 and under the Higashi-Meihan Expressway, and it is a ten-minute walk from Otai Station on the Jōhoku Line.

Lines

 (Station number: T01)
 Nagoya Railroad
 Inuyama Line (Station number: IY03)

Layout
The station has two wickets, the North Wicket and the South Wicket.

Platforms

Adjacent stations

|-
!colspan=5|Nagoya Railroad

References

External links 
 

Railway stations in Japan opened in 1991
Railway stations in Aichi Prefecture